Marumba quercus, the oak hawk-moth, is a moth of the family Sphingidae. The species was first described by Michael Denis and Ignaz Schiffermüller in 1775.

Distribution 
It is found in southern Europe, North Africa, the Near East and Mesopotamia.

Description 

The wingspan is 85–125 mm. The female is slightly larger than the male.

Biology 
The larvae feed on oak species, primarily species with dry leaves such as cork oak and holm oak.

References

External links

"06817 Marumba quercus ([Denis & Schiffermüller], 1775) - Eichenschwärmer". Lepiforum e.V. Retrieved 17 December 2018

Marumba
Moths described in 1775
Moths of Europe
Moths of Asia
Taxa named by Michael Denis
Taxa named by Ignaz Schiffermüller